Cutaneous B-cell lymphomas constitute a group of diseases that occur less commonly than cutaneous T-cell lymphoma, and are characterized histologically by B-cells that appear similar to those normally found in germinal centers of lymph nodes.  Conditions included in this group are:

 Primary cutaneous diffuse large B-cell lymphoma, leg type
 Primary cutaneous follicular lymphoma
 Primary cutaneous marginal zone lymphoma
 Intravascular large B-cell lymphoma
 Plasmacytoma
 Plasmacytosis

See also 
 Cutaneous T-cell lymphoma
 List of cutaneous conditions

References

External links 

Lymphoid-related cutaneous conditions
Lymphoma